Colaianni is a surname. Notable people with the surname include:

 James Colaianni (1922–2016), author, theologian and activist
 Joseph V. Colaianni (born 1933), trial judge of the United States Court of Claims
 Louis Colaianni (born 1959), voice and speech coach, and author